Anyuy may refer to:
 Anyuy Mountains in far northeastern Russia
 Anyuy Volcano
 Anyuy (Kolyma), a right tributary of the Kolyma in the Sakha (Yakutia) Republic, Russia
 Maly Anyuy, a tributary of the Anyuy
 Bolshoy Anyuy, a tributary of the Anyuy
 Anyuy (Amur), a tributary of the Amur in Khabarovsk Krai, Russia